Heshan is a town located in the county-level city of Changle, Fuzhou City, Fujian Province, China.

A large part of the town's population lives abroad, mainly in New York City (Chinatown, Manhattan), Europe (Chinatowns in Europe), and Taiwan.

See also 
 List of township-level divisions of Fujian

References 

Township-level divisions of Fujian
Fuzhou
Towns in China